Kurumbel Steppe is a steppe in Omsk and Novosibirsk oblasts, Western Siberia, Russia. It is located between the Irtysh River and Lake Chany. The name comes from the former village of Kurumbel.

Birds
At least 126 species of birds nest here: demoiselle crane, little bustard, pallid harrier, red-footed falcon, black-winged pratincole, common crane etc.

In spring and autumn, numerous Arctic and sub-Arctic migrant birds stop here for rest and feeding.

Kurumbel steppe is of great international significance, for at least 5 bird species.

Lakes
Chany, Ulzhai, Chebakly, etc.

Gallery

See also
 Baraba steppe

References

Landforms of Novosibirsk Oblast
Landforms of Omsk Oblast
Eurasian Steppe